St. Pancras North was a borough constituency represented in the House of Commons of the Parliament of the United Kingdom. It elected one Member of Parliament (MP) by the first-past-the-post system of election. It was created in 1885 and abolished in 1983 with the area becoming part of the new constituency of Holborn and St Pancras.

Boundaries 

1918–1950: The Metropolitan Borough of St Pancras wards of one and two, and the part of ward number three lying to the north and west of a line running along the middle of Camden Road from a point where that road is intersected by the eastern boundary of the metropolitan borough to the point where that road crosses the Regent's Canal and thence westward along the middle of that canal to the western boundary of Ward number three.

1950–1974: The Metropolitan Borough of St Pancras wards of one, two, three and four.

1974–1983: The London Borough of Camden wards of Camden, Chalk Farm, Gospel Oak, Grafton, Highgate, and St John's.

Members of Parliament

Election results

Elections in the 1880s

Elections in the 1890s
Cochrane-Baillie was elevated to the peerage as Lord Lamington.

Elections in the 1900s

Elections in the 1910s

Elections in the 1920s

Elections in the 1930s

Elections in the 1940s

Elections in the 1950s

Elections in the 1960s

Elections in the 1970s

:

:

References 

 

Parliamentary constituencies in London (historic)
Constituencies of the Parliament of the United Kingdom established in 1885
Constituencies of the Parliament of the United Kingdom disestablished in 1983
Politics of the London Borough of Camden